IA/VT Colorful is a rhythm game for the PlayStation Vita developed by Marvelous, and is based on Vocaloid's IA Project. It was released in Japan on July 30, 2015.

Development
The lead developer of the game, Kenichiro Takaki, was previously the producer of Senran Kagura. The game features downloadable content support.

Gameplay

The rhythm game requires players to press the face buttons and D-pad directions of the PlayStation Vita in time with musical notes. Notes appear from various directions and follow lines of varying shapes until they reach a circular "catcher". Pressing the buttons as the note is in the middle of the catcher will score the most points. Certain notes allow the player to press any button they desire and will fill the player's "Colorful" gauge by an amount depending on the player's timing. Certain parts of each song, represented by a red bar on the timeline, are "Colorful sections" and will use the Colorful gauge the player has earned beforehand to give them a score multiplier for the duration of the Colorful section.

As the player progresses through a music track, the game stage gradually becomes more colorful. The feedback of each music track is dynamic and varies based on the player's own performance. The game revolves around the virtual diva known as IA, who is a Vocaloid developed by the company 1st Place Co., Ltd. The game features 60 different songs, with an additional 19 songs available as downloadable content. Some music tracks feature new music background video footage exclusive to the game, whilst others contain the original video track for the song. The game features different play modes, including challenge modes with varying difficulty levels, consecutive play, and free play.

Song list
A total of 60 playable songs are available in the game, and following the initial game release 19 more released as additional downloadable content.

 Songs with an orange background are DLC and must be purchased on the PlayStation Network to be played.

Reception
Famitsu gave the game a review score of 34/40. The game sold 38,881 physical retail copies within its first week of release, taking third place within Japan's weekly software sales rankings.

Kotaku compared IA/VT Colorful to the Hatsune Miku: Project DIVA game series, as well as praising the soundtrack of the game, writing "IA/VT is a solid first step for a Miku-rivalling music game series. It succeeds in the most important areas with its great game play interface and an astounding soundtrack. On the other hand, it is missing many of the extras [...] from the Project Diva games and the song unlock process makes playing a chore at times. Still, if you are a Project Diva fan, you owe it to yourself to give IA/VT a try.

References

External links
  
 IA official site
 Official debut game trailer 

2015 video games
Music video games
PlayStation Vita games
PlayStation Vita-only games
Creative works using vocaloids
Japan-exclusive video games
Video games developed in Japan
Video games featuring female protagonists